Aseri Masivou Radrodro (born 1972) is a Fijian politician and Cabinet Minister. He is a member of the Social Democratic Liberal Party (SODELPA).
 
Radrodro was born in Serea Village in Naitasiri Province and educated at Soloira District School and Queen Victoria School. He subsequently studied finance at the University of the South Pacific, before gaining a Masters in Business Administration in 2006. He has worked as a public servant, manager, and for the Fiji Sports Council, holding various managerial positions. He has also served on various Boards including the Fiji Electricity Authority (FEA), Fijian Holdings, Fiji TV, Merchant Finance and FHLS.

He joined SODELPA in 2014 and was elected to the Parliament of Fiji at the 2014 elections, gaining 2169 votes. Initially appointed shadow minister for Transport and Infrastructure, in 2017 he was appointed shadow minister for Economy. In the run-up to the 2018 election, then-SODELPA leader Sitiveni Rabuka attempted to block him from being a party candidate, but backed down after intervention from party president Naiqama Lalabalavu. In March 2018 he was noted as a future SODELPA leader.

He was re-elected in the 2018 elections, winning 2,312 votes. In July 2020 he was investigated by the Fiji Independent Commission Against Corruption for his use of parliamentary allowances. In August 2020 he stood for party leader, but lost to Viliame Gavoka. When SODELPA split in 2021 he stayed with the party, and ran as a candidate for the party in the 2022 election.

He was re-elected in the 2022 election. On 24 December 2022 he was appointed Minister of Education in the coalition government of Sitiveni Rabuka.

References

Living people
1972 births
People from Naitasiri Province
University of the South Pacific alumni
Social Democratic Liberal Party politicians
Members of the Parliament of Fiji
Education ministers of Fiji